Frank Douglas Coby III (born August 18, 1979) is an American professional racing driver who competes full-time in the NASCAR Whelen Modified Tour, driving the No. 10 Ford/Chevrolet for his team, Doug Coby Racing, he has also competed part-time in the NASCAR Camping World Truck Series, driving the No. 24 Chevrolet Silverado for GMS Racing. He is a six-time champion of the Whelen Modified Tour, winning titles in 2012, 2014, 2015, 2016, 2017 and 2019.

Racing career
Coby started racing in quarter midgets before moving up to pro stocks, late models and SK modifieds. He won two Whelen All-American Series championships at his home track, Stafford Motor Speedway. He has also dabbled in open-wheel midget racing.

In 2002, Coby debuted in the NASCAR Whelen Modified Tour at Stafford and ran part-time in the series for a number of years. He won his first NWMT race at Stafford in 2006 and continued to run part-time on the tour for the next half-decade, earning his second career win at Thompson Speedway Motorsports Park in 2011. He also ran in the Valenti Modified Racing Series during that time. The win at Thompson came with car owner Wayne Darling; Coby won his first NWMT championship with Darling in 2012 on the strength of five race wins.

The following year, Coby was second in points and decided to switch teams to Mike Smeriglio Racing for the 2014 season. He won his first race with the team, the Battle at the Beach, and claimed the 2014 NWMT championship.

In 2015, Coby entered the NWMT season finale at Thompson Speedway Motorsports Park tied with Ryan Preece atop the point standings after Coby had controversially spun Preece for a race win at New Hampshire Motor Speedway in the later stages of the season. Coby won the race and the championship after a mid-race pass on Justin Bonsignore for the lead. Also that year, he made his debut in the NASCAR Whelen Southern Modified Tour, driving a No. 21 car for Smeriglio in the season-opener at Caraway Speedway, finishing 15th.

For the 2016 season, Coby claimed nine NWMT pole awards and claimed his third consecutive tour championship, becoming the first driver in tour history to accomplish such a feat.

Following the first two races of the 2017 NASCAR Whelen Modified Tour season, Coby was 16th in the point standings but rallied to claim the championship by the end of the season. Also that year, he made his debut in the K&N Pro Series East race, driving the No. 43 for Calabrese Motorsports at Thompson Speedway Motorsports Park, finishing 4th.

In 2018, Coby finished third in the NWMT point standings while rival Justin Bonsignore won the championship. Coby won two races the following year and claimed his sixth title by nine points over Bonsignore. He also ran a limited stock car schedule, winning a feature at the World Series of Asphalt.

Coby won another NWMT championship in 2019, using a large accumulated points lead to withstand a flat tire suffered in the season finale.  After the championship, Coby's car owner, Mike Smeriglio, decided to sell his team, leaving Coby without a ride. In the following offseason, Coby bought one of Smerigilio's three cars and started his own team, Doug Coby Racing with his crew chief, Phil Moran.

In 2021, it was announced Coby would compete in the inaugural Superstar Racing Experience race at Stafford Motor Speedway. (As a result, he skipped the Whelen Modified Tour race at Oswego Speedway, which was on the same day.) Driving a No. 10 car (the same number he uses in the Modified Tour), he won the second heat and the main event in front of the hometown crowd. This led to him getting a ride with GMS Racing in the NASCAR Camping World Truck Series at the Bristol night race in September. It will be his debut in NASCAR's top 3 series. The deal came together through GMS Team President Mike Beam, who served as Coby's crew chief in the SRX race at Stafford.

Personal life
Outside of racing, Coby worked in financial services before founding Rescue Dog Realty, a real estate company that donates commission earnings to rescue shelters.

Motorsports career results

NASCAR
(key) (Bold – Pole position awarded by qualifying time. Italics – Pole position earned by points standings or practice time. * – Most laps led.)

Camping World Truck Series

K&N Pro Series East

Whelen Modified Tour

Whelen Southern Modified Tour

 Season still in progress

Superstar Racing Experience
(key) * – Most laps led. 1 – Heat 1 winner. 2 – Heat 2 winner.

 Season still in progress

References

External links
 

Living people
1979 births
NASCAR drivers
Racing drivers from Connecticut
People from Milford, Connecticut